Charles Adderley may refer to:

Charles Adderley, 1st Baron Norton (1814–1905), British politician
Charles Adderley, 2nd Baron Norton (1846–1926)
Charles Adderley (cricketer) (1912–1985), English First class cricketer

See also
Adderley (disambiguation)